Adelpha basiloides, the spot-celled sister, is a species of admirals, sisters in the family of butterflies known as Nymphalidae. It is found in North and Central America.

The MONA or Hodges number for Adelpha basiloides is 4527.

References

Further reading

External links

 

Adelpha
Articles created by Qbugbot
Butterflies described in 1865